Sufit is a surname. Notable people with the surname include: 

Alisha Sufit (born 1946), English singer-songwriter
Robert L. Sufit, American neurologist